The rusty flowerpiercer (Diglossa sittoides) is a species of bird in the family Thraupidae. It is found in Argentina, Bolivia, Colombia, Ecuador, Peru, and Venezuela.

Its natural habitats are subtropical or tropical moist montane forests, subtropical or tropical high-altitude shrubland, and heavily degraded former forest.

Gallery

References

rusty flowerpiercer
Birds of the Northern Andes
rusty flowerpiercer
Taxonomy articles created by Polbot